Sixteenmile Creek is a stream in the municipality of West Elgin, Elgin County in Southwestern Ontario, Canada. It is part of the Great Lakes Basin, and flows from a point just south of Ontario Highway 401 east of exit 129 through the community of Rodney, past the community of New Glasgow, to its mouth at the community of Port Glasgow on Lake Erie.

References

Sources

Rivers of Elgin County
Tributaries of Lake Erie